Nebria lafresnayei is a  long (but can be as small as ) species of ground beetle in the Nebriinae subfamily that can be found in Cantabrian Mountains of Andorra, France, and in Serville commune of Spain.

Subspecies
The species have 2 subspecies that could be found in Andorra, France, and Spain:
Nebria lafresnayei cantabrica Bruneau de Mire, 1964 Spain
Nebria lafresnayei lafresnayei Audinet-Serville, 1821 Andorra, France, Spain

References

External links
Nebria lafresnayei at Carabidae.org

lafresnayei
Beetles described in 1821
Beetles of Europe